Sir Gerald Berkeley Hurst QC (4 December 1877 – 27 October 1957) was a British Conservative Party politician.

Gerald Berkeley Hertz was born in Bradford to Fanny Mary and William Martin Hertz, a wool merchant. His Jewish grandparents on both sides came from Germany in the mid-nineteenth century. He was educated at Bradford Grammar School and Lincoln College, Oxford. Hertz changed the spelling of his surname to Hurst in 1916. He served in the British Army as a lieutenant during World War I and was stationed in the Middle East and France. In 1905 he married Margaret Alice, one of the daughters of Alfred Hopkinson, Vice-Chancellor of Manchester University and a Member of Parliament. Their only son was killed in Libya in World War II.

He was the Member of Parliament (MP) for Manchester Moss Side from 1918 to 1923 and from 1924 to 1935. He was a keen supporter of Imperial Preference. Hurst was knighted in 1929. In 1938, he was appointed to the county court for Croydon and West Kent. Hurst stepped down from the county judgeship in 1952. From 1947 to 1955, he served as Commissioner of Divorce Cases. His younger brother was Sir Arthur Frederick Hurst.

References

External links
 

1877 births
1957 deaths
20th-century King's Counsel
UK MPs 1918–1922
UK MPs 1924–1929
UK MPs 1929–1931
UK MPs 1931–1935
Conservative Party (UK) MPs for English constituencies
British Army officers
British Army personnel of World War I
Alumni of Lincoln College, Oxford
UK MPs 1922–1923
English people of German-Jewish descent
People educated at Bradford Grammar School
Jewish British politicians